Los Montones Airport is an airstrip  north of San Cristóbal, Dominican Republic.

There is rising terrain southwest through west of the runway.

See also

Transport in Dominican Republic
List of airports in Dominican Republic

References

External links
OpenStreetMap - Los Montones Airport
OurAirports - Los Montones Airport
SkyVector - Los Montones Airport

Airports in the Dominican Republic
Buildings and structures in San Cristóbal Province